Cubix is a South Korean animated TV series.

Cubix may also refer to:
Cubix, a smartphone brand made by Cherry Mobile in the Philippines
Cubix am Alexanderplatz, a cinema in Berlin
 Cubix International, a company that designed Lyo and Merly,  mascots for the 2010 Summer Youth Olympics in Singapore
Cubix Pictures, film production company in Singapore which made CGI film Zodiac: The Race Begins (2006)